SME is a brand name of an English company that produces high end tonearms and turntables, whose name has become synonymous with the industry standard detachable headshell mount.

History

SME was founded by Alastair Robertson-Aikman  in 1946 under the title The Scale Model Equipment Company Limited to manufacture scale models and detail parts for the model engineering trade. It was During the 1950s the company moved away from model making to precision engineering, principally parts for aircraft instruments and business machines.

In 1959, Robertson-Aikman required a pick-up arm for his own use and an experimental model was built. It received such an enthusiastic reception from friends in the sound industry that it was decided to produce it commercially and the first SME precision pick-up arm appeared in September 1959. Production was 25 units per week composed entirely of individually machined components. At this time a new factory situated in Mill Road, Steyning was opened and the Company's name was changed to SME Limited, a less committal title to suit its new activities.

1961 the company opened a new factory in Mill Road, Steyning, Sussex and the name was changed to SME Limited.

In December 2016 the company was acquired by Ajay Shirke with a view to preserve the brand's legacy and extend research and development activities, appointing a new CEO and a distributor for the UK market, Padood.

In May 2018 the company acquired the rights to the Garrard Transcription Turntable brand as well as Loricraft Audio, the only officially authorised Garrard service agent. Intending to develop the Garrard audio brand in the near future.

Products

Series II
The company is notable for its 3009 and 3012 (9" and 12" respectively) tone arms which were widely adopted for audiophile and broadcast use during the 1960s and 1970s, at the higher end of the market. These arms featured a polished, bright-anodised aluminium  main tube with a lightweight headshell, knife edge horizontal bearings, and an anti skating bias provided by a weight that hung by a nylon filament.  
Versions  were produced with both fixed and interchangeable headshells; the SME headshell mount (based on an Ortofon design) became the de facto industry standard, and is still widely used today on consumer and especially DJ decks. Audiophile arms today tend to not use the SME mount, but this is not due to other standards replacing the SME but because audiophile arms now tend to not have interchangeable headshells at all  in an effort to reduce mass and improve rigidity, though at slight expense of user flexibility.   
Some cartridges were produced that mounted directly into the SME headshell mount of the arm (rather than into a headshell), notably from Ortofon.

Series III
The Series III was introduced in the late 1970s incorporating changes from the Series II models (which continued in production) covering both styling and its exceptionally thin and lightweight main tube, the entire arm being interchangeable rather than just the headshell. The Series III had very low effective mass to fit high compliance cartridges such as the Shure V15 IV.
Although technically advanced, the Series III never achieved the market dominance of the Series II.

Series V
The Series V arm was developed as a medium mass arm more suited to emerging moving-coil cartridges with lower compliance than previously available moving magnet cartridges. The removable headshell was eliminated, and the horizontal knife bearing was replaced with ball bearings, both in order to provide a more rigid structure for the cartridge.

In recent decades, as with many of their competitors, the company's products have tended to move further and further upmarket. Recent products include the SME V tonearm, and extremely expensive (and consequently relatively rare) decks. The company bucked their upmarket move with the M2 tonearm which sits at the bottom of their current range .

Gallery

See also
 List of phonograph manufacturers

References

External links
SME homepage

Phonograph manufacturers
Technology companies established in 1946
English brands
Audio equipment manufacturers of the United Kingdom